Amherst Independent School District is a public school district based in Amherst, Texas (USA). The district operates one K-12 school, Amherst School.

The district includes a section of central Lamb County.

Finances
In the 2010–2011 school year, the appraised valuation of property in the district was $51,219,000. The maintenance tax rate was $0.104 and the bond tax rate was $0.000 per $100 of appraised valuation.

In the 2019–2021 school year, the overall expenditure was $1,945,848

Academic achievement
In 2011, the school district was rated "academically unacceptable" by the Texas Education Agency. Six percent of districts in Texas in 2011 received the same rating. No state accountability ratings were to be given to districts in 2012. A school district in Texas can receive one of four possible rankings from the Texas Education Agency: exemplary (the highest possible ranking), recognized, academically acceptable and academically unacceptable (the lowest possible ranking).

Historical district TEA accountability ratings
2004: academically acceptable
2005: academically acceptable
2006: academically acceptable
2007: academically acceptable
2008: academically acceptable
2009: academically acceptable
2010: academically acceptable
2011: academically unacceptable

In 2015, the school was rated "Met Standard" by the Texas Education Agency.

Schools
In the 2011–2012 school year, the district had students in two schools.
Amherst School (grades PK-12)
PEP (grades 9–12)

Athletics
Amherst High School participates in Basketball, American football, Track/cross country and Golf for boys. The school also participates Basketball Track/cross country and Golf for girls. For the 2012 through 2014 school years, Amherst High School was to play six-man football in UIL Class 1A 6-man Football Division II.

The Amherst Bulldogs compete in these sports - 

Cross Country, 6-Man Football, Basketball, Golf, Tennis & Track

See also

List of school districts in Texas
List of high schools in Texas

References

External links
Amherst ISD

School districts in Lamb County, Texas
Public K-12 schools in Texas
Schools in Lamb County, Texas